Zdeňka Bezděková (April 19, 1907 – August 12, 1999) née Vondrušková, was a Czech writer, philosopher, and translator.  She was largely known for writing Říkali mi Leni about a Czech girl living in post-war Germany.

Early life
Bezděková graduated from the girls' grammar school in České Budějovice, Czech Republic, and went on to study philosophy and literature in Prague and Paris, graduating in 1931.

She first married on June 22, 1929, in Prague, to grammar school professor František Bezděk. They divorced in 1930.

Career
Since 1933 she taught, first at secondary school level, then at a grammar school in České Budějovice. After the Second World War she was a teacher in Sušice and Prague. From 1949 she taught Czech literature at the Faculty of Education of the university in České Budějovice (now the University of South Bohemia in České Budějovice), where she later headed the Department of Philology. She retired in 1962.

Bibliography

Fiction

Non-fiction
Stará literatura česká (Praha, Státní pedagogické nakladatelství 1952, 1954, 1957).
Literatura pro mládež (pro posluchače Vyšší školy pedagogické; Praha, SPN 1954, 1955, 1957).
Literatura doby obrozenské (Určeno pro posluchače vyšší pedagické školy a DS; Praha, SPN, 1956) Zobrazení exemplářů s možností jejich objednání.

References

Czech writers
Czech philologists
1907 births
1999 deaths
20th-century philologists